Mananjara is a rural municipality in Analamanga Region, in the Central Highlands of Madagascar. It has a population of 4,117 in 2019.
It is located in the East of Mahitsy and the National road 4. It has been connected to electricity since 2019.

References

Populated places in Analamanga